Boracéia is a municipality in the state of São Paulo in Brazil. The population is 4,868 (2020 est.) in an area of 122 km2. The elevation is 480 m.

References

External links 

 

Municipalities in São Paulo (state)
Portuguese words affected by the 1990 spelling reform